Bentley (formerly Sutton) is an incorporated town in southeast Hancock County, Illinois, United States. The population was 35 at the 2010 census.

Geography
Bentley is located in southeastern Hancock County at  (40.343653, -91.111994). Illinois Routes 94 and 110, a four-lane highway, pass just west of the town. The highway leads north  to Carthage, the county seat, and southwest as IL 110  to Quincy, while IL 94 branches off to the southeast and leads to Bowen,  from Bentley.

Climate

Demographics

As of the census of 2000, there were 43 people, 18 households, and 12 families residing in the town. The racial makeup of the town was 100.00% White.

There were 18 households, out of which 33.3% had children under the age of 18 living with them, 55.6% were married couples living together, 5.6% had a female householder with no husband present, and 33.3% were non-families. 33.3% of all households were made up of individuals, and 16.7% had someone living alone who was 65 years of age or older. The average household size was 2.39 and the average family size was 3.00.

In the town, the population was spread out, with 23.3% under the age of 18, 7.0% from 18 to 24, 23.3% from 25 to 44, 27.9% from 45 to 64, and 18.6% who were 65 years of age or older. The median age was 42 years. For every 100 females, there were 87.0 males. For every 100 females age 18 and over, there were 106.3 males.

The median income for a household in the town was $23,125, and the median income for a family was $24,375. Males had a median income of $11,750 versus $16,250 for females. The per capita income for the town was $9,269. There were 18.2% of families and 15.4% of the population living below the poverty line, including 16.7% of under eighteen and none of those over 64.

References

1869 establishments in Illinois
Populated places established in 1869
Towns in Hancock County, Illinois
Towns in Illinois